Vera Jocić (21 August 1923 – 22 May 1944) was a Yugoslav partisan and People's Hero of Yugoslavia.

She was born in the village of Sindjelić, Kingdom of Serbs, Croats and Slovenes, in a Serbian colonists' family and fought in the Yugoslav People's Liberation War. She was wounded near Sasa in the Bulgarian occupation zone of Yugoslavia, (today North Macedonia), where she died. 
She inspired the famous song "Eyes" by Aco Šopov.

References

1923 births
1944 deaths
People from Gazi Baba Municipality
Recipients of the Order of the People's Hero
Yugoslav Partisans members
Women in the Yugoslav Partisans
Yugoslav military personnel killed in World War II
Macedonian people of Serbian descent
Military personnel from Skopje